Gerhard Breitenberger may refer to:

 Gerhard Breitenberger (footballer, born 1954), Austrian footballer
 Gerhard Breitenberger (footballer, born 1979), Austrian footballer